Flat Top Mountain is the highest summit of the Flat Tops in the Rocky Mountains of North America. The summit of Flat Top Mountain is the highest point in Garfield County, Colorado.

See also

List of mountain peaks of Colorado
List of the most prominent summits of Colorado
List of Colorado county high points

References

External links

Mountains of Colorado
Mountains of Garfield County, Colorado
Routt National Forest
White River National Forest
North American 3000 m summits